Sos mi hombre is an Argentine telenovela, which aired on El Trece in 2012-2013. It starred Luciano Castro and Celeste Cid.

Premise
The two telenovelas made by Pol-Ka at the beginning of 2012, Lobo and the second season of Los únicos, were cancelled because of poor ratings. Graduados, a fiction aired in the rival channel Telefe, became a huge success. As a result, Pol-Ka rushed the creation of a new telenovela, Sos mi hombre, that filled the timeslot of Lobo. The main actors were Luciano Castro and Celeste Cid. Although Sos mi hombre did not prevail against Graduados either, it had better rating than the previous telenovelas. The last episode had 12,8 rating points.

The program was nominated for the 2013 edition of the Martín Fierro Awards, as best daily fiction. Other nominations are: Luciano Castro as best lead actor of daily fiction, Celeste Cid as lead actress in fiction, Osvaldo Laport as best guest star, Joaquín Furriel as secondary actor in daily fiction, and Eugenia Tobal as secondary actress in daily fiction.

Controversy
The writer Adriana Lorenzón (who wrote El elegido, Por amor a vos and Los Roldán) and the actor Pepe Monje accused the program of being similar to another one they wrote 2 years before. Their program, called "Fuego en tu boca", only had a pilot episode and was never aired. The plot was about a boxer from the La Boca neighbourhood, who also works as a firefighter. Actors Juan Palomino, Maximiliano Guerra, Chechu Bonelli, Jorgelina Aruzzi and Luís Machín worked in that production as well.

The TV channel El Trece replied that the main idea of the telenovela had already been proposed to actor Facundo Arana in 2004, predating both series. The portrayal of the world of box is also similar to previous productions from Pol-Ka, such as Campeones.

Plot
Ringo is a retired boxer, facing economic problems and trying to gain the child custody of his son. He works as a volunteer firefighter. Camila is a young doctor, who works in public hospitals and helps in social diners.

Cast
 Luciano Castro as Juan José "Ringo" Di Genaro
 Celeste Cid as Camila Silvia Garay
 Gabriel Goity as Oscar "Oso" Villar 
 Gonzalo Valenzuela as Alejo Correa Luna
 Ludovico Di Santo as Diego Hernán Jáuregui 
 Eugenia Tobal as Gloria Calazán
 Jimena Barón as Rosa "Maravillosa" Montes
 Gimena Accardi as Brenda Garay
 Lito Cruz as Manuel Ochoa 
 Joaquín Furriel as Ariel Yamil "Turco" Nassif
 Felipe Colombo as Máximo Duarte
 María Rosa Fugazot as Jesusa García García
 Pablo Cedrón as Damasio Flores
 Luz Cipriota as Eva Catalina Ochoa
 Liz Solari as Guadalupe Llorente
 Victorio D'Alessandro as Rafael Villar Medina
 Abel Ayala as Diego Armando "Guachín" Carrazco
 Ariel Staltari as Pepe
 Juan Alari as Ismael "Cachito" Delgado
 Ian Acevedo as Santino Di Genaro
 Adriana Salonia as Sandra Medina
 Esteban Lamothe as Jorge Carrizo
 Bárbara Lombardo as Juana "Zorra" Torres
 Raúl Rizzo as Iván Garay 
 Osvaldo Laport as Guido Guevara
 Andrea Pietra as Verónica Santiago
 Luciana González Costa as Marisa
 Diego Alonso Gómez as Garza "Garcés"

Awards

Nominations
 2013 Martín Fierro Awards
 Best actress of daily drama (Celeste Cid)

References

External links
 Sos mi hombre 
 

2010s Argentine television series
2012 telenovelas
2013 telenovelas
Pol-ka telenovelas
Sports fiction
2012 Argentine television series debuts
2013 Argentine television series endings